Big Cottonwood Wildlife Management Area at  is an Idaho wildlife management area in Cassia County northwest of the town of Oakley. The land for the WMA was purchased in 1993 by the Idaho Department of Fish and Game and had previously been a cattle ranch and farm for nearly 100 years. 

The WMA is at the foothills of the South Hills in Sawtooth National Forest.  Wildlife found in the WMA include mule deer, Yellowstone cutthroat trout, and reintroduced California bighorn sheep.

References

Protected areas established in 1993
Protected areas of Cassia County, Idaho
Wildlife management areas of Idaho